Vereor Deus, Non Dogma (Latin for Fear God, Not Dogma) is an extended play from Mayfly. Voluminous Records released the EP on February 11, 2014.

Critical reception

Awarding the EP three and a half stars for Jesus Freak Hideout, Michael Weaver states, "Vereor Deus Non Dogma is nowhere close to perfect, but it does offer up quite a few enjoyable moments." Ian Webber, rating the EP an eight out of ten at Cross Rhythms, writes, "this short release is worth seeking out." Giving the EP two stars from HM Magazine, Collin Simula says, "this EP leaves the listener wanting much more."

Signaling in a three star review for Indie Vision Music, Lee Brown responds, "Mayfly brings a sound that is influenced by the past, but is perfectly timed to help shape the future of heavy music." Topher Parks, indicating in a four star review at Jesus Wired, recognizes, "Vereor Deus Non Dogma has its strengths as well as its flaws". Assigning the EP four stars from The Christian Music Review Blog, Brad Johnson replies, "the production quality on this EP was great, it was not excellent."

Track listing

References

2014 EPs
Mayfly (band) albums